Morning Star was a schooner launched in 1805 in the United States of America, possibly under another name. From 1809 she sailed under British registry. She sailed to Africa, the Mediterranean, and South America. She was last listed in 1833.

Career
Morning Star first appeared in Lloyd's Register (LR) in 1809. 

In 1813 Daniel Bennett & Son purchased Morning Star.

They sold her the next year.

Fate
Morning Star was last listed in the registries in 1833. The data in LR was unchanged since 1830.

Citations

References
 

1805 ships
Ships built in the United States
Age of Sail merchant ships of England